opened in 1972 in Ishigaki, Okinawa Prefecture, Japan. The collection covers the archaeology, history, art, and folk traditions of Ishigaki and the Yaeyama Islands.

See also
 Okinawa Prefectural Museum
 Museums in Okinawa Prefecture

References

External links
 Ishigaki City Yaeyama Museum 
 Ishigaki City Yaeyama Museum 

Museums in Okinawa Prefecture
Yaeyama Islands
Museums established in 1972
1972 establishments in Japan